Haykadzor is a village in the Ani Municipality of the Shirak Province of Armenia near the Armenia–Turkey border

Demographics

References 

Populated places in Shirak Province